Punta Colorada Airstrip  is a privately owned public-use dirt airstrip located south of the town of La Ribera, Municipality of Los Cabos, Baja California Sur, Mexico.

It is located in the Punta Colorada area of the East Cape area on the Gulf of California coast.

It is used solely for general aviation purposes.

External links
PCO at World Airport Codes.
PCO at Flightstats.

Airports in Baja California Sur
Los Cabos Municipality (Baja California Sur)